Wrong Side of the Daylight is the debut studio album from Danish singer Thomas Ring Petersen, it was released on March 4, 2011 in Denmark. It has peaked to number 2 on the Danish Albums Chart

Singles
"Break the Silence" was released as the first single on 8 February 2011. It peaked to number 4 on the Danish Singles Chart.
"Leave a Light On" was released as the second single on 29 April 2011.

Track listing

Chart performance
On 18 March 2011, Wrong Side of the Daylight entered the Danish Albums Chart at number 2.

Year-end charts

Release history

References 

2011 debut albums